Chang Ch'ung-ho or Zhang Chonghe (May 17, 1914 – June 17, 2015), also known by her married name Ch'ung-ho Chang Frankel, was a Chinese-American poet, calligrapher, educator and Kunqu opera singer. She is hailed as "the last talented woman of the Republic of China".

Life and career
Chang Ch'ung-ho (Zhang Chonghe) was born in Shanghai in 1914, with her ancestral home in Hefei, Anhui. Her great-grandfather, Zhang Shusheng, was a high-ranking military officer in the Huai Army.  Her father, Zhang Wuling, was an educator. Her mother, Lu Ying, was a housewife. She had six brothers and three sisters. Her eldest sister, Chang Yuen-ho (1907–2003), was a Kunqu expert. Her second sister, Zhang Yunhe (1909–2002), was also a Kunqu expert. Her third sister, Chang Chao-ho (1910–2003), was a teacher and writer, and the wife of the celebrated novelist Shen Congwen.

At the age of 21, she was accepted to Peking University. After graduating from PKU, Chang Ch'ung-ho became an editor for the newspaper Central Daily News.

In 1947, Chang met Hans Fränkel at Peking University, they married in November 1948, and settled down in the United States in January 1949. They had a daughter, Emma Fränkel and a son, Ian Frankel. Ch'ung-ho taught at Yale University, Harvard University and 20 other universities, teaching traditional Chinese culture.

After the Cultural Revolution, Chang visited Suzhou in 1979.

In 1986, Chang Ch'ung-ho and her sister Chang Yuen-ho attended a theatrical performance which was commemorated the 370 anniversary of the death of Tang Xianzu in Beijing.

In the Autumn of 2004, Chang Ch'ung-ho held an exhibition of paintings in Beijing.

On June 17, 2015, Chang Ch'ung-ho died in New Haven, Connecticut, aged 101.

Selected works
 Taohuayu or Peach Blossom Fish

References

Further reading

1914 births
2015 deaths
Artists from Shanghai
National University of Peking alumni
Poets from Shanghai
Educators from Shanghai
Republic of China (1912–1949) emigrants to the United States
Chinese women poets
Yale University faculty
Chinese centenarians
American centenarians
Chinese women painters
Republic of China calligraphers
20th-century poets
20th-century women writers
People from Hefei
Taiwanese people from Shanghai
Women calligraphers
20th-century Chinese calligraphers
Women centenarians
Kunqu actresses
20th-century Chinese actresses
20th-century Chinese women singers
Actresses from Shanghai
Singers from Shanghai